The 1992 Paris–Nice was the 50th edition of the Paris–Nice cycle race and was held from 8 March to 15 March 1992. The race started in Fontenay-sous-Bois and finished at the Col d'Èze. The race was won by Jean-François Bernard of the Banesto team.

General classification

References

1992
1992 in road cycling
1992 in French sport
March 1992 sports events in Europe